Frampton Pools is a  biological Site of Special Scientific Interest in Gloucestershire, notified in 1974. The pools are on the edge of the village of Frampton on Severn.

The site is in the Severn Vale and consists of a number of lakes created as a result of gravel extraction. These provide a good open water habitat which is important for wintering wildfowl. The site is mostly standing water which is surrounded by broadleaved woodland, scrub and the margins support marginal vegetation. The larger, deeper northern pit has steep banks and is often subjected to disturbance by sailing, the southern pit is smaller and shallower with well-vegetated banks and is less disturbed. In 2009 funding was secured to improve the conservation condition of the site through the Aggregates Levy Sustainability Fund.

Species
The over-wintering birds include large numbers of mallard, teal, shoveler, pochard, tufted duck and pintail. Rarer species also visit such as smew and scaup. The lakes are used as a breeding area for tufted duck, mallard and great crested grebe. The vegetation around the pools can hold wintering Eurasian siskin, lesser redpoll and common chiffchaff, while in the breeding season the site has held European turtle dove, common nightingale, Eurasian reed warbler, little egret and common kingfisher.

It is a good area for invertebrates, notably dragonflies.

Fishing
Coarse fishing is permitted at Frampton Pools.

References

SSSI sources
 Natural England SSSI information on the citation
 Natural England SSSI information on the Frampton Pools units

External links
 Natural England (SSSI information)

Sites of Special Scientific Interest in Gloucestershire
Sites of Special Scientific Interest notified in 1974